"Boyfriend" is a song by English singer Mabel, released on 26 February 2020. The song is featured as a bonus track on the Digital & Streaming edition of Mabel's debut studio album High Expectations (2019). "Boyfriend" samples "Remember Me" (1997) by Blue Boy which in turn sampled "Woman of the Ghetto" (1969) by Marlena Shaw.

Background
Mabel announced the song's release on 21 February 2020. She described the song as "wanting someone in your life doesn't mean you can't still be dat bitchh".

Composition
Musically, "Boyfriend" is an empowering upbeat pop anthem with a bumping production. Lyrically, the song sees Mabel wanting a boyfriend, but saying how she doesn't necessarily need one "I want a boyfriend... Even though a man ain't something I need".

Music video
The song's accompanying music video was directed by Isaac Rentz and was released on 26 February 2020. According to Mabel the video for "Boyfriend" was inspired by late American singer Aaliyah. It sees Mabel make her ideal boyfriend in an underground computer laboratory. It is a gender-reverse flip of the 1985 film Weird Science.

Track listing

Credits and personnel
Credits adapted from Tidal.

 Mabel – songwriting, vocals
 Steve Mac – production, songwriting, keyboards
 Camille Purcell – songwriting, backing vocals
 Marlena Shaw – songwriting
 Richard Evans – songwriting
 Robert Miller – songwriting
 Chris Laws – drum programming, recording, studio personnel
 Bill Zimmerman – engineering, studio personnel
 Phil Tan – mixing, studio personnel
 Dann Pursey – percussion, recording, studio personnel

Charts

Weekly charts

Year-end charts

Certifications

Release history

References

2020 singles
2020 songs
Mabel (singer) songs
Polydor Records singles
Song recordings produced by Steve Mac
Songs written by Kamille (musician)
Songs written by Steve Mac
Songs written by Mabel (singer)